"The Ballad of Lost C'Mell" is a science fiction novella by American writer Cordwainer Smith. It was first published in October 1962 in Galaxy Magazine, and since reprinted in several compilations and omnibus editions.

The main characters are Jestocost, a lord of the Instrumentality of Mankind, and C'mell, a beautiful cat-derived "underperson" (an animal given human speech and form but no rights, while retaining some of its inherent genetics – for example, C'mell's father held the long-jump record at the time) who works as a "girly-girl" (similar to an escort) at the main spaceport.

Plot summary
The story revolves around Jestocost's ambition to help the oppressed underpeople gain rights without upsetting the established social order.  While debating how to make contact, Jestocost telepathically accesses C'mell's thoughts during the funeral of her athlete father, and overhears her call for help to someone named E-telly-kelly.  After awkwardly questioning her later (which she at first mistakes for a crude pass), he is permitted to make contact with the E'telekeli, an eagle-derived underperson unknown to the Instrumentality with immense telepathic powers, who may be the leader of the underpeople. 

Jestocost and the E'telekeli agree to a scheme in which C'mell will pretend to be a witness to illegal smuggling. When this case is brought before the assembled Lords of the Instrumentality, C'mell provides manufactured evidence which causes the Instrumentality's computer system, the Bank, to display probable smuggling routes and hideouts on the Bell, the Bank's three-dimensional display system. While this is going on, C'mell remains surreptitiously in physical contact with Jestocost. This allows him to telepathically relay the images on the Bell to the E'telekeli. The images appear too quickly for a normal human mind to interpret, but the E'telekeli is able to do so.

Since C'mell's "evidence" proves worthless the Lords dismiss her angrily, but the information stolen from the Bank and Bell provides the underpeople with details about the main human checkpoints and a list of safe havens where they can hide from the Instrumentality while seeking rights.

Their plan has required C'mell and Jestocost to work closely together, and C'mell (working for the first time with a human who respects her intelligence) falls in love with Jestocost, but he suppresses his own feelings as a distraction, and they separate when the plan succeeds. They only meet again once, many years later when the underpeople are well on their way to achieving their rights. Their discussion is friendly, but C'mell is privately saddened by Jestocost's lack of romantic feeling toward her.

Ultimately, during Jestocost's life, underpeople achieve a lower-grade citizenship, for which their efforts were partly responsible.  The story of Jestocost and C'mell never becomes public, but a folk song among the underpeople entitled "The Ballad of Lost C'mell" tells a poetic and partial version of the events.

On his deathbed, many years after C'mell has died of old age, Jestocost has a brief telepathic conversation, apparently with the E'telekeli's successor, in which he learns that she never loved anyone but him. The telepathic underperson assures Jestocost that his name will be linked with C'mell's forever in history and folklore.

Connections to other works
Smith's novel Norstrilia is partly a sequel to this story (it is set a few years after the main part of the story, includes all of the main characters, and is concerned with some of the same issues).  C'mell also appears in Smith's story "Alpha Ralpha Boulevard", which takes place earlier in terms of chronology and order of publication.

C'mell's adventures take place during the early years of the Rediscovery of Man. According to J. J. Pierce's conjectural timeline of the Instrumentality (included in We, the Underpeople and other collections of Smith's stories) this seems to be some time between AD 15,000 and 16,000.

"The Ballad of Lost C'Mell" was included in The Science Fiction Hall of Fame, Volume Two, a collection of the 22 greatest science fiction novellas published before the introduction of the Nebula Awards in 1965, as selected by the Science Fiction and Fantasy Writers of America.

Note: The M of C'mell is often capitalized in the title of the story (as in this article) but in the text it is uncapitalized.

The name "C'mell" is derived from that of Smith's (real name Paul Linebarger) pet cat, Melanie.

The title was not the one that Smith originally gave the story, but was derived from the text by Galaxy magazine's then-editor Frederik Pohl. This was one of a number of Smith's story-titles that Pohl changed for publication because he disliked the originals. Pohl's replacement titles are all derived from the texts of the stories in order to retain the character of Smith's writing.

Notes

External links 
 
 
 The Ballad of Lost C'Mell (Radio Play)

1962 short stories
Short stories by Cordwainer Smith
Works originally published in Galaxy Science Fiction
Fiction books about telepathy